Evangelista Torricelli or just Torricelli was the name of at least four ships of the Italian Navy and may refer to:

 , a  launched in 1918 and discarded in 1930.
 , an  launched in 1934 and transferred to Spain in 1937.
 , a  launched in 1939 and sunk in 1940.
 , a  launched in 1944 as the USS Lizardfish and transferred to Italy in 1960. She was scrapped in 1976.

Italian Navy ship names